Berks is a Philippine television show produced by ABS-CBN which was aired from November 16, 2002 to March 20, 2004, replacing K2BU.

Cast

Main cast 
 Heart Evangelista as Gwyneth
 John Prats as Javier Montelibano
 Karel Marquez as Penelope
 Sarah Christophers as Pamela Sue
 Hazel Ann Mendoza as Brooke
 Ketchup Eusebio as Ketchup
 Marc Acueza as Oreo
 Khalil Kaimo as Nacho
 Alysson Lualhati as Jennifer Love
 Greg Martin as Bruce
 Jay Salas as Chad
 Glaiza de Castro as Halley
 Bernard Cardona as Simon
 Angelica Panganiban as Nicole
 Carlo Aquino as Aries

Supporting cast
 Winnie Cordero as Tita Potty
 Joy Chiong as Oprah
 John Wayne Sace
 Jojit Lorenzo
 Chris Quimpo as Miguel
 Rafael Rosell as George
 Pauleen Luna as Kate

Other cast
 Jenny Miller as Gwyneth's stepmother
 Mandy Ochoa as Gwyneth's father
 Carla Humphries as Paris
 Kristoffer Horace Neudeck as Gwyneth's brother
 Jackie Castillejo as Nicole's aunt
 Joy Viado
 Gigette Reyes
 Joel Torre as Javie's father
 Carmi Martin as Javie's mother
 Sharmaine Arnaiz as Javie's stepmother
 Carlos Agassi
 Gandong Cervantes as Oreo's father
 Dustin Reyes
 Tonette Escario

External links

See also
 List of programs broadcast by ABS-CBN

ABS-CBN drama series
ABS-CBN original programming
Philippine teen drama television series
2002 Philippine television series debuts
2004 Philippine television series endings
Filipino-language television shows
Television shows set in the Philippines
Television series about teenagers